The Homeland Security Subcommittee on Emergency Management and Technology is a subcommittee within the House Homeland Security Committee. Established in 2007 as a new subcommittee, it handles many of the duties of the former Subcommittee on Emergency Preparedness, Science, and Technology. Between 2019 and 2023, it was known as the Homeland Security Subcommittee on Emergency Preparedness, Response and Recovery.

Members, 117th Congress

Historical membership rosters

115th Congress

116th Congress

External links
 Official Site

Homeland Emergency